The Best Christmas Ever may refer to:

 The Best Christmas Ever (That '70s Show), an episode of That '70s Show
 The Best Christmas Ever (story), a 2004 short story by James Patrick Kelly
 The Best Christmas... Ever! a 2006 compilation album
 Best Christmas Ever (program block), a program block on American cable network AMC